Richard Peck may refer to:

 Richard Peck (RAF officer) (1893–1952), Air Marshal of the Royal Air Force
 Richard Peck (writer) (1934–2018), American novelist
 Richard Peck (British Army officer) (born 1937), English cricketer and army officer
 Richard Peck (lawyer) (born 1948), Canadian lawyer